Union Sportive des Clubs du Cortenais is a French association football team founded in 1908. It is based in Corte, Haute-Corse, France. The club currently plays in Championnat National 3, the fifth tier of football in France. They were finally promoted in 2020, after controversially being denied promotion in 2019, despite winning a decision via the Corsica league appeal board, which was later overturned by the FFF. It plays at the Parc des Sports de Chabrières in Corte, which has a capacity of 1,000.

The club was originally called US Corte, but changed its name in 1998 after it merged with amateur side FC Corte Castrila.

References

External links
 Official footeo site 

 
Football clubs in Corsica
Association football clubs established in 1908
USC Corte
Corte, Haute-Corse
Sport in Haute-Corse
Football clubs in France